Tropaia is a village and a former municipality in Arcadia, Peloponnese, Greece. Since the 2011 local government reform, it is part of the municipality Gortynia, of which it is a municipal unit. The municipal unit has an area of 187.228 km2. As of 2011 it has a population of 2,887. The village is located near the Ladona Lake.

References

Populated places in Arcadia, Peloponnese